NGC 1161 is a lenticular galaxy approximately 90 million light-years away from Earth in the constellation of Perseus. It was discovered, along with NGC 1160, by English astronomer William Herschel on October 7, 1784.

NGC 1161 is classified as a Type 1.9 Seyfert galaxy. It forms a visual pair with the galaxy NGC 1160. Both galaxies are located between the Local and Perseus superclusters in the Perseus Cloud close to the centre of the Local Void.

Image gallery

See also 
 Spiral galaxy 
 List of NGC objects (1001–2000)

References

External links 

 
 SEDS

Lenticular galaxies
Seyfert galaxies
Perseus (constellation)
1161
11404
Astronomical objects discovered in 1784
Discoveries by John Herschel